Brian Bertelsen (born 19 April 1963) is a retired Danish football midfielder.

References

1963 births
Living people
Danish men's footballers
Vejle Boldklub players
Danish expatriate men's footballers
Expatriate footballers in Switzerland
Danish expatriate sportspeople in Switzerland
FC Wettingen players
FC Basel players
FC St. Gallen players
FC Luzern players
FC Locarno players
Association football forwards